Lee Spurr (born 27 July 1987) is a former Australian rules footballer who played for the Fremantle Football Club in the Australian Football League (AFL). He an experienced utility player who played in two premierships for Central District in the South Australian National Football League (SANFL).

After playing well in games for Peel Thunder in the West Australian Football League (WAFL), Spurr was elevated to the senior playing list prior to round 5 after Josh Mellington was placed on the long-term injury list. He then made his debut in round 6 of the 2012 AFL season against Gold Coast at Metricon Stadium as the substitute.  He was activated during the third quarter, replacing Stephen Hill who had injured his leg in the first half. Spurr retired from AFL football at the end of the 2018 season.

References

External links

WAFL Statistics

1987 births
Living people
Fremantle Football Club players
Central District Football Club players
Peel Thunder Football Club players
Australian rules footballers from Queensland
Morningside Australian Football Club players